The Oranje Nassau III was a Dutch coal mine located in Heerlen. The mine was in operation from 1914 until 1973.  It was the third of four mines collectively known as the Oranje Nassau Mijnen.

External links
 http://citg.tudelft.nl/?id=18387 Coal Mining in the Netherlands (Delft University of Technology)

Coal mines in the Netherlands
Buildings and structures in Heerlen